The 1943–44 season was CA Oradea's 22nd season, 5th in the Hungarian football league system and their 3rd season in the Nemzeti Bajnokság I. In this season the club was known as Nagyváradi Atletikai Club, Nagyváradi AC or simply as NAC and managed to obtain the first big performance in the history of the football from Oradea, a Nemzeti Bajnokság I title. A title won in a league considered to be one of the best in Europe at that time, also being the first club outside Budapest that won the Hungarian championship in 41 official seasons.

First team squad

Competitions

League standings

Result round by round

Results

Magyar Kupa
Preliminary Round.

See also

1943–44 Magyar Kupa
Nemzeti Bajnokság I

Notes and references

CA Oradea seasons
1943–44 in Romanian football